The South African Traditional Music Awards (SATMA Awards) are an annual award ceremony.  SATMA Awards are about celebrating music made in the style of the people and various language groups of South Africa. Founded by Dumisani Goba, The awards aim to "eliminate tribalism and other divisive measures"; the official slogan is "My Culture, Your Culture, One Nation".

The National Heritage Council were fundraisers and overseers for the SATMAs from 2008-2010; this role was then taken over by the SATMA Awards Foundation.

SATMA Awards 2014 Day One Categories

SATMA Awards 2014 Day Two Categories

 Best Xitsonga Album - Joe Shirimani – Ka Tika
 Best Tshivenda Album - Tycoon 4 Sho – Vhutshilo
 Best Indian Album -Flash Entertainers – Flash 45 
 Best SiSwati Album - Zandi N – Hlala Ngent’fombi
 Best IsiNdebele Album -Amatshatangubo – Kwathula’moya
 Best SePedi Album - Julia Aphane – Serurubele/Butterfly
 Best Cultural Talk Show - Melumzi Xego – Forte FM
 Best SeSotho Album -  Motho oa maloro mabe fanini No2 – Motho Oa Maloro Mabe Fanini 
 Best Boeremusiek Album - Willie Jooster – Treklavier Treffers
Best IsiXhosa Album - Jessica Mbangeni – Igoli
Best San Album - Paulus – Mapondo
Best SeTswana Album -Serantlhatlha Arts Ensemble – Serope Mperekele
 Best Maskandi Album - Amageza Amahle – Isisu Somkhwenyana
 Most Downloaded Song - Ezika-bhaka – Thayi Lemoto
 Best Music Radio Program - Umhlobo Wenene – Lavutha Ibhayi
 Song of the Year -
 Best Traditional DJ - Saba Mbixane
 Best Radio Station - Umhlobo wenene
 Founders Awards -

Ceremonies

Categories

Current categories 
 Best Male Artist/Group
 Best Female Artist/Group
 Best Afro Soul Song
 Best African Jazz Song
 Best Reggae Album
 Best Traditional Praise Singer
 Best Indigenous Poet
 Best Upcoming Artist/Group
 Best Traditional Accapella Music Song
 Best Traditional Music Community Radio Presenter
 Best Department of Art & Culture
 Best Department Cultural Affairs Chief Director
 Best Traditional Producer
 Best Traditional House Music Song
 Best SePedi Artist/Group
 Best TshiVenda Artist/Group
 Best Xitsonga Artist/Group
 Best Ndebele Artist/Group
 Best IsiXhosa Artist/Group
 Best SeTswana Artist/Group
 Best Siswati Artist/Group
 Best Indian Artist/Group
 Best Sesotho Artist/Group
 Best Boeremusiek Artist/Group
 Best Maskandi Artist/Group(Traditional/Digital)
 Best Traditional Collaboration Song
 Best Traditional Music Artist/Group of the year

References

South African music
African music awards
South African music awards